The 2020 AFC Champions League group stage was played from 10 February to 4 December 2020. A total of 32 teams competed in the group stage to decide the 16 places in the knockout stage of the 2020 AFC Champions League.

The competition was suspended due to the COVID-19 pandemic in Asia after matchday 3 on 4 March 2020. On 9 July 2020, the AFC announced that it would restart on 14 September 2020. All matches after restart were played in Qatar.

Draw

The draw for the group stage was held on 10 December 2019, 16:30 MYT (UTC+8), at the AFC House in Kuala Lumpur, Malaysia. The 32 teams were drawn into eight groups of four: four groups each in the West Region (Groups A–D) and the East Region (Groups E–H). Teams from the same association could not be drawn into the same group.

The mechanism of the draw was as follows:
For the West Region, there was no associations draw due to country protection. A draw was held for each of the four associations with more than one direct entrant (United Arab Emirates, Saudi Arabia, Qatar, Iran) to determine for each team their group positions:
The three direct entrants of the United Arab Emirates were drawn to positions A1, B2, or C3, while the play-off winners West 1 (which their play-off team may advance from) were allocated to position D4.
The three direct entrants of Saudi Arabia were drawn to positions B1, C2, or D3, while the play-off winners West 2 (which their play-off team may advance from) were allocated to position A4.
The two direct entrants of Qatar were drawn to positions C1 or D2, while the play-off winners West 3 and 4 (which their play-off teams may advance from) were drawn to positions A3 or B4.
The two direct entrants of Iran were drawn to positions D1 or C4.
The direct entrants of Uzbekistan and Iraq were allocated to positions B3 and A2 respectively.
For the East Region, a draw was held for the two associations with three direct entrants (South Korea, China) to determine the order of associations. After the associations draw, a draw was held for each of the four associations with more than one direct entrant (South Korea, China, Japan, Australia) to determine for each team their group positions:
The three direct entrants of the first association drawn (South Korea or China) were drawn to positions E1, F2, or G3, while the play-off winners East 1 or 2 (which their play-off team may advance from) were allocated to position H4.
The three direct entrants of the second association drawn (South Korea or China) were drawn to positions F1, G2, or H3, while the play-off winners East 1 or 2 (which their play-off team may advance from) were allocated to position E4.
The two direct entrants of Japan were drawn to positions G1 or H2, while the play-off winners East 3 and 4 (which their play-off teams may advance from) were either allocated to F4 and E3 respectively (if South Korea were the first association drawn), or drawn to positions E3 or F4 (if China were the first association drawn).
The two direct entrants of Australia were either drawn to positions H1 or F3 (if South Korea were the first association drawn, or if China were the first association drawn and the play-off winners East 4 were drawn to position E3), or positions H1 or E2 (if China were the first association drawn and the play-off winners East 3 were drawn to position E3).
The direct entrants of Thailand and Malaysia were allocated to either positions G4 and E2 (if South Korea were the first association drawn), positions F3 and G4 (if China were the first association drawn and the play-off winners East 4 were drawn to position E3), or positions E2 and G4 (if China were the first association drawn and the play-off winners East 3 were drawn to position E3) respectively.

The following 32 teams entered into the group stage draw, which included the 24 direct entrants and the eight winners of the play-off round of the qualifying play-offs, whose identity was not known at the time of the draw.

Format

In the group stage, each group was played on a double round-robin basis, with matches played home-and-away before the suspension due to the COVID-19 pandemic, but moved to centralised venues after restart. The winners and runners-up of each group advanced to the round of 16 of the knockout stage.

Tiebreakers

The teams were ranked according to points (3 points for a win, 1 point for a draw, 0 points for a loss). If tied on points, tiebreakers were applied in the following order (Regulations Article 10.5):
Points in head-to-head matches among tied teams;
Goal difference in head-to-head matches among tied teams;
Goals scored in head-to-head matches among tied teams;
Away goals scored in head-to-head matches among tied teams; ''(this tiebreaker was removed since the matches were played in centralised venues after restart)
If more than two teams were tied, and after applying all head-to-head criteria above, a subset of teams were still tied, all head-to-head criteria above were reapplied exclusively to this subset of teams;
Goal difference in all group matches;
Goals scored in all group matches;
Penalty shoot-out if only two teams playing each other in the last round of the group were tied;
Disciplinary points (yellow card = 1 point, red card as a result of two yellow cards = 3 points, direct red card = 3 points, yellow card followed by direct red card = 4 points);
Association ranking.

Schedule
The original schedule of each match day, as planned before the COVID-19 pandemic, was as follows.
Matches in the West Region were played on Mondays and Tuesdays. Two groups were played on each day, with the following groups being played on Mondays:
Matchdays 1 and 2: Groups A and B
Matchday 3: Groups A and C
Matchday 4: Groups B and D
Matchdays 5 and 6: Groups C and D
Matches in the East Region were played on Tuesdays and Wednesdays. Two groups were played on each day, with the following groups being played on Tuesdays:
Matchdays 1 and 2: Groups E and F
Matchday 3: Groups E and G
Matchday 4: Groups F and H
Matchdays 5 and 6: Groups G and H

Effects of the COVID-19 pandemic
Due to the COVID-19 pandemic in Asia, the Australian federal government banned foreigners travelling from China, and Football Federation Australia told the AFC that Australia could no longer host matches against Chinese teams. The AFC held an emergency meeting on 4 February 2020 to determine plans for the tournament, including but not limited to rescheduling of matches in the East Region. After the meeting, the AFC decided to postpone matches involving Chinese clubs from the first three match days except for Chiangrai United versus Beijing FC:
Group E: FC Seoul v Beijing FC (from 11 February to 28 April), Melbourne Victory v Beijing FC (from 3 March to 28 May)
Group F: Perth Glory v Shanghai Shenhua (from 11 February to 28 April), Ulsan Hyundai v Shanghai Shenhua (from 18 February to 19 May), FC Tokyo v Shanghai Shenhua (from 4 March to 27 May)
Group G: Suwon Samsung Bluewings v Guangzhou Evergrande (from 12 February to 29 April), Johor Darul Ta'zim v Guangzhou Evergrande (from 19 February to 20 May), Vissel Kobe v Guangzhou Evergrande (from 3 March to 26 May)
Group H: Sydney FC v Shanghai SIPG (from 12 February to 29 April), Jeonbuk Hyundai Motors v Shanghai SIPG (from 19 February to 20 May), Yokohama F. Marinos v Shanghai SIPG (from 4 March to 27 May)

the following matches were postponed to a later date between late February and early March, prior to AFC's announcement to postpone all matches:
Group A: Al-Ahli v Al-Shorta and Al-Wahda v Esteghlal (2 March)
Group B: Al-Hilal v Pakhtakor and Shabab Al-Ahli v Shahr Khodro (3 March)
Group C: Persepolis v Al-Taawoun and Al-Duhail v Sharjah (2 March)
Group D: Al-Ain v Al-Sadd and Sepahan v Al-Nassr (3 March), Al-Nassr v Sepahan (6 April)
Group E: FC Seoul v Chiangrai United (3 March)
Group F: Perth Glory v Ulsan Hyundai (4 March, later postponed to 18 March)

After meetings with representatives of the member associations from the West Region held on 7–8 March 2020, it was agreed that all West Region group stage matches on matchdays 4–6 would be postponed to new dates yet to be confirmed due to the COVID-19 pandemic in Asia.

After a meeting with representatives of the member associations from the East Region held on 2 March 2020, it was agreed that group stage matches on matchdays 3–6 which could not be played would be moved to 19–20 May, 26–27 May, 16–17 June and 23–24 June.

The AFC announced on 14 April 2020 that all matches scheduled for May and June would be postponed until further notice. Only 27 group stage matches out of the 96 scheduled had been played by then.

On 9 July 2020, the AFC announced the new schedule for the remaining matches, with all matches played at centralised venues. The West Region matches postponed from matchdays 3–6 would be played on 14–15, 17–18, 20–21 and 23–24 September, and the East Region matches postponed from matchdays 1–6 would be played on 16–17, 19–20, 22–23, 25–26, 28–29 October and 31 October – 1 November. On 10 September 2020, the AFC announced that East Region group stage matches were rescheduled to be played on 18–19, 21–22, 24–25, 27–28 November, 30 November – 1 December and 3–4 December.

Centralised venues after restart
On 16 July 2020, the AFC announced that Qatar would host all West Region matches after restart. On 27 July 2020, the AFC announced that Malaysia would host the East Region matches of Groups G and H after restart. However, on 9 October 2020, the AFC announced that following an agreement with Qatar Football Association, all East Region matches after restart would also be played in Qatar.

The following centralised venues in Qatar were used:
Al Janoub Stadium, Al Wakrah (1 match of Group A, 7 matches of Group B, 2 matches of Group G, 6 matches of Group H)
Education City Stadium, Doha (7 matches of Group C, 1 match of Group D, 2 matches of Group E, 9 matches of Group F)
Jassim bin Hamad Stadium, Doha (1 match of Group C, 7 matches of Group D, 7 matches of Group E, 1 match of Group F)
Khalifa International Stadium, Doha (7 matches of Group A, 1 match of Group B, 7 matches of Group G, 3 matches of Group H)

Groups

Group A

Group B

Group C

Group D

Group E

Group F

Group G

Group H

Notes

References

External links
, the-AFC.com
AFC Champions League 2020, stats.the-AFC.com

2
February 2020 sports events in Asia
March 2020 sports events in Asia
September 2020 sports events in Asia
November 2020 sports events in Asia
December 2020 sports events in Asia